"They Say It's Wonderful" is a popular song written by Irving Berlin for the musical Annie Get Your Gun (1946), where it was introduced by Ethel Merman and Ray Middleton. A film version in 1950 again featured the song when it was performed by Howard Keel and Betty Hutton. More recently it was performed in an episode of The Marvelous Mrs. Maisel by Darius de Haas.

Recordings
Ethel Merman recorded it for the original Decca Records cast album of Annie Get Your Gun (1946). In 1979, she recorded a "camp" version for The Ethel Merman Disco Album, but it was not released on the original vinyl record. It was issued as a bonus track on the CD reissue in 2002.
Andy Russell (Billboard no. 10 in 1946)
Perry Como (Billboard no. 27 in 1946)
Bing Crosby recorded the song on January 22, 1946 (Billboard no. 12 in 1946)
Frank Sinatra (1946)
Betty Hutton, Howard Keel, soundtrack recording, Annie get Your Gun, MGM, (1950)
Modern Jazz Quartet - The Modern Jazz Quartet (1957)
Sarah Vaughan - Sarah Vaughan Sings Broadway: Great Songs from Hit Shows (1958)
Johnny Mathis - Heavenly (1959)
Doris Day (1960)
John Coltrane and Johnny Hartman - John Coltrane and Johnny Hartman (1963)
Jimmy Scott - Falling In Love Is Wonderful (1963)
Dionne Warwick - I'll Never Fall in Love Again (1970)
Tony Bennett - Bennett/Berlin (1987)
Judy Garland
Stacey Kent - The Tender Trap (1998)
Bernadette Peters - Annie Get Your Gun Revival Cast Recording (1999)
Eliane Elias - Everything I Love (2000)
Michael Poss recorded the song combined with "I Need To Be In Love" - Silver Screen Serenades (2000) 
Sathima Bea Benjamin - Musical Echoes (2002)
Beegie Adair (2002)
Kirsten Dunst - Spider-Man 3 (2007)
Susan Lucci - ABC Presents: Love Affair (2008)
Seth MacFarlane - Once in a While (2019)
Suzi Quatro (1986)

References

Songs from Annie Get Your Gun
Songs written by Irving Berlin
1946 songs
1940s jazz standards
Ethel Merman songs